The Bermuda Public Services Union (BPSU) is a trade union in Bermuda. It was founded in 1952 as the Bermuda Civil Service Association, and changed its name in 1971.

The BPSU is affiliated to Public Services International and Union Network International.

References

External links
 Bermuda Public Services Association official website

Trade unions in Bermuda
Public Services International
UNI Global Union
Public sector trade unions
Trade unions established in 1952
1952 establishments in Bermuda